is a former Japanese football player. She played for the Japan national team.

Club career
Aizawa was born in Mie Prefecture on September 10, 1980. After graduating from high school, she joined Matsushita Electric Panasonic Bambina (later Speranza FC Takatsuki) in 1999. In the 1999 season, she was selected for the Best Young Player awards. She retired in 2010.

National team career
In November 1999, when Aizawa was 19 years old, she was selected for the Japan national team for 1999 AFC Championship. At this competition, on November 12, she debuted and scored 3 goals against Nepal. She also played at the 2002 Asian Games. She played 5 games and scored 4 goals for Japan until 2002.

National team statistics

References

1980 births
Living people
Association football people from Mie Prefecture
Japanese women's footballers
Japan women's international footballers
Nadeshiko League players
Speranza Osaka-Takatsuki players
Asian Games bronze medalists for Japan
Asian Games medalists in football
Women's association football midfielders
Footballers at the 2002 Asian Games
Medalists at the 2002 Asian Games